Brian Grant is a British music video  and television director and producer. In 1982 he co-founded MGMM Productions with Scott Millaney, Russell Mulcahy, and David Mallet. MGMM became the most successful UK production company of the 80's. He started his career as a cameraman and went on to become a noted music video director, he also shot many movies and television series. He is famous for directing episodes of British television series including As If, Hex, Doctor Who, Party Animals, Sinchronicity, Britannia High, Highlander: The Series, Queen of Swords, Clocking Off, New Tricks, Sinbad, The Worst Witch, Our Girl, Video Killed the Radio Star, Lennon's Last Weekend,  No Room For Ravers. He has been BAFTA and Emmy nominated. He has also directed many commercials and notable music videos through the 1980s for Olivia Newton-John, Donna Summer, Peter Gabriel, Queen, The Human League,  Rod Stewart, Tina Turner, Aretha Franklin, Dolly Parton, Kim Wilde, Whitney Houston, Spandau Ballet and Duran Duran.

His video for Olivia Newton-John's  "Physical" won the first Video Grammy ever awarded at the 25th Annual Grammy Awards, (Video of the Year). He is also known for his work on the 1983 Donna Summer video "She Works Hard for the Money"; the video would be nominated for five MTV Awards, and Donna Summer became the first African-American female artist to get played in high rotation, at the then fledgling MTV station. The video remains a tribute to women around the world. He was also hired to direct her 1983 HBO concert "A Hot Summer's Night..."; after that, he was in high demand as music video director. He also shot two of singer Whitney Houston's videos, "How Will I Know" (1985) and "I Wanna Dance With Somebody (Who Loves Me)" (1987).

Filmography
 The Tell Tale Heart (1984)
 The Hitchhiker (1986)
 She Wolf Of London (1990)
 Sweet Poison (1991)
 Love Kills (1991)
 The Helen Samuels Story (1992)
 Mann & Machine (1992)
 Darkman (1992)
 Complex Of Fear (1992)
 Sensation (1993)
 Day of Reckoning (1993)
 The Red Shoe Diaries (1994)
 The Second Noah (1995)
 The Immortals (1995)
 Bloodlines: Legacy Of A Lord (1996)
 Bugs (1997)
 Highlander: The Series (1998)
 The Raven (1998)
 Lucy Sullivan Is Getting Married (1999)
 Queen Of Swords (1999)
 Cyberstalking (1999)
 As If (2001)
 As If (2002)
 As If USA (2003)
 Clocking Off (2002)
 Hex (2003)
 Hex (2004)
 Gladiatress (2004)
 Doctor Who (2004)
 Love Bytes (2004)
 Hex II (2005)
 Sinchronicity (2005)
 Party Animals (2006)
 Life Is Wild (2006)
 Britannia High (2007)
 Breaker (2008)
 The Allegation (2009)
 Project Lotus (2010)
 Sinbad (2010)
 Video Killed The Radio Star (2011)
 New Tricks (2012)
 Deadinburgh (2013)
 New Tricks (2013)
 Waterloo Road (2014)
 Video Killed The Radio Star (2015)
 The Last Lennon Interview (2016)
 The Worst Witch (2016)
 Our Girl (2018)
 Video Killed The Radio Star (2018)
 Lennon's Last Weekend (2020)
 No Room For Ravers (2021)

Notable music videos

 M - "Pop Muzik" (1979)
 Sparks - "Beat the Clock" (1979)
 Queen – "Play the Game" (1980)
 The Human League - "Open Your Heart" (1981)
 Kim Wilde - "Kids In America" (1981)
 Olivia Newton-John - "Physical" (1981)
 Peter Gabriel - "Shock the Monkey" (1982)
 Queen – "Back Chat" (1982)
 Queen – "Calling All Girls" (1982)
 XTC - "Senses Working Overtime" (1982)
 Duran Duran - "Hungry Like The Wolf" (1982)
 Talk Talk - "My Foolish Friend" (1983)
 The Fixx - "Saved By Zero" (1983)
 Rod Stewart - "What Am I Gonna Do (I'm So In Love With You)" (1983)
 Bee Gees - "The Woman in You" (1983)
 Donna Summer - "She Works Hard for the Money" (1983)
 Donna Summer - "Unconditional Love" (1983)
 Duran Duran - "New Moon on Monday" (1984)
 Kenny Loggins - "I'm Free (Heaven Helps the Man)" (1984)
 Meat Loaf - "Modern Girl" (1984)
 Aretha Franklin - "Freeway of Love" (1985)
 Whitney Houston - "How Will I Know" (1985)
 Tina Turner - "Private Dancer" (1985)
 The Moody Blues - "Your Wildest Dreams" (1985)
 Gary Moore - "Over the Hills and Far Away" (1986)
 T'Pau - "China in Your Hand" (1987)
 Jody Watley - "Still a Thrill" (1987)
 Whitney Houston - "I Wanna Dance With Somebody (Who Loves Me)" (1987)
 T'Pau - "Secret Garden" (1988)
 T'Pau - "Only the Lonely" (1989)

Grant also directed the original "Scarlett" version of the video for Stevie Nicks's 1983 song "Stand Back", but Nicks nixed that version, saying she didn't like the way she looked in the video, and reshot it.

References

External links
 
 

British music video directors
British television directors
British television producers
Living people
British film directors
Year of birth missing (living people)